is a ward of Kitakyūshū, Fukuoka, Japan.

Facilities
Important facilities include Green Park, Ecotown recycling area, Gakuen Toshi academic area, and Hibiki container terminal (opened on April 1, 2005). An underwater tunnel was being constructed in 2005–2006 between Tobata and Wakamatsu wards to link the Hibiki container terminal with Kokura.

Green Park
Green Park is a large green area which includes a tropical house with rare plants, fish and birds; a herb garden; a rose garden (rare in Japan); a children's play area; a Japanese garden; a wallaby enclosure and boating facilities. It is not well known outside Kitakyushu. Sometimes indoor and open-air concerts are staged. There is also an observation tower.

Wind farm
There is a wind farm on the coast, harnessing wind power for electricity.
There is no particular controversy about the sightliness or otherwise of this wind farm, as in some other countries. It is on windy reclaimed land.

Beaches
The beaches are small and pleasant. A larger one is at Ashiya-machi to the west, beyond the city limits. Swimming is limited to the summer months.

Culture
The writer Hino Ashihei was born in Wakamatsu and his birthhouse can be visited.

Photo gallery

External links

 Wakamatsu ward office (Japanese)
 Green Park- Official Page (Japanese)
 Kyushu Institute of Technology (KIT) Wakamatsu campus is in the Gakuen Toshi Academic zone.
 Hino Ashihei

Wards of Kitakyushu